Marshall Abraham Shires (February 12, 1917 – July 23, 1993) was an American football player.  He played college football for the Tennessee Volunteers football team and was selected by the Central Press Association as a third-team tackle on the 1940 College Football All-America Team. During Shires' three years at Tennessee (1938-1940), the Volunteers compiled a 31-2 record, won three SEC championships and two national championships, and participated in the Orange, Rose, and Sugar Bowls. He was drafted by the Cleveland Rams with the 14th pick in the 1941 NFL Draft. However, due to military service during World War II, Shires did not make his debut in the National Football League until the 1945 NFL season and as a member of the Philadelphia Eagles. He was inducted into the Tennessee Sports Hall of Fame in 1995.

References 

1917 births
1993 deaths
American football tackles
Philadelphia Eagles players
Players of American football from Chicago
People from Alderson, West Virginia
Players of American football from West Virginia
Tennessee Volunteers football players